Bajėnai I (Bajėnai 1st, formerly) is a village in Kėdainiai district municipality, in Kaunas County, in central Lithuania. According to the 2011 census, the village had a population of 29 people.

History
A fragment of an ancient stone axe has been found in Bajėnai I. The Bajėnai Manor is known since the end of the 16th century. In the 19th century, it belonged to the Tyszkiewicz family and later to the Jesuits. They have created a dairy and vegetable farm in Bajėnai.

Demography

Images

References

Villages in Kaunas County
Kėdainiai District Municipality